Hinton/Entrance Airport  is located  west of Hinton, Alberta, Canada, just north of the Athabasca River. There are hangars, fuel, and minimal rest facilities on site.

See also
Hinton/Jasper-Hinton Airport
Jasper Airport

References

Hinton, Alberta
Registered aerodromes in Alberta
Yellowhead County